Players and pairs who neither have high enough rankings nor receive wild cards may participate in a qualifying tournament held one week before the annual Wimbledon Tennis Championships.

Seeds

  Paula Ormaechea (second round)
  Galina Voskoboeva (qualified)
  Caroline Garcia (qualified)
  Polona Hercog (second round)
  Eleni Daniilidou (second round, retired)
  Sharon Fichman (first round)
  Yvonne Meusburger (qualified)
  Luksika Kumkhum (first round)
  Dinah Pfizenmaier (first round)
  Vania King (qualifying competition, lucky loser)
  Mariana Duque Mariño (qualified)
  Maria Sanchez (second round)
  Anastasia Rodionova (first round)
  Jessica Pegula (first round, retired)
  Teliana Pereira (second round)
  Anna Karolína Schmiedlová (qualifying competition, lucky loser)
  Barbora Záhlavová-Strýcová (qualified)
  Sesil Karatantcheva (qualifying competition)
  Michelle Larcher de Brito (qualified)
  Julia Glushko (qualifying competition)
  Maryna Zanevska (first round)
  Kurumi Nara (qualifying competition)
  Tadeja Majerič (second round)
  Nastassja Burnett (qualifying competition)

Qualifiers

  Carina Witthöft
  Galina Voskoboeva
  Caroline Garcia
  Petra Cetkovská
  Ajla Tomljanović
  Maria Elena Camerin
  Yvonne Meusburger
  Virginie Razzano
  Eva Birnerová
  Barbora Záhlavová-Strýcová
  Mariana Duque Mariño
  Michelle Larcher de Brito

Lucky losers

  Vania King
  Anna Karolína Schmiedlová

Qualifying draw

First qualifier

Second qualifier

Third qualifier

Fourth qualifier

Fifth qualifier

Sixth qualifier

Seventh qualifier

Eighth qualifier

Ninth qualifier

Tenth qualifier

Eleventh qualifier

Twelfth qualifier

External links

2013 Wimbledon Championships on WTAtennis.com
2013 Wimbledon Championships – Women's draws and results at the International Tennis Federation

Women's Singles Qualifying
Wimbledon Championship by year – Women's singles qualifying
Wimbledon Championships